Francis William Markall  (24 September 1905 – 9 August 1992) was a Roman Catholic Archbishop.

Born in Harringay, Markall was ordained as a Catholic priest at the age of 32 in 1937 and migrated to what was then known as Rhodesia, where he was appointed Coadjutor Archbishop of Salisbury (now Harare, Zimbabwe) in 1956. He resigned 20 years later on 31 May 1976 as Archbishop of Salisbury.

On 29 April 1956, aged 50, he was appointed Titular Archbishop of Cotyaeum and ordained as such five months later, on 
8 September 1956.
He died on 9 August 1992, aged 86, as Archbishop Emeritus of Salisbury. He was a Council Father at the Second Vatican Council.

References

People from Harringay
People from Harare
Second Vatican Council
1905 births
1992 deaths
White Rhodesian people
Rhodesian Roman Catholic archbishops
Roman Catholic archbishops of Harare
British expatriate bishops